The 22895 / 22896 Durg–Firozpur Cantonment Antyodaya Express is a Superfast train belonging to South East Central Railway zone that runs between  and .

It is being operated with 22895/22896 train numbers on a weekly basis.

Coach composition 

The trains is completely general coaches trains designed by Indian Railways with features of LED screen display to show information about stations, train speed etc. Vending machines for water. Bio toilets in compartments as well as CCTV cameras and mobile charging points and toilet occupancy indicators.

Service

22895/Durg–Firozpur Cantonment Antyodaya Express has an average speed of 58 km/hr and covers 1671 km in 28 hrs 40 mins.
22896/Firozpur Cantonment–Durg Antyodaya Express has an average speed of 55 km/hr and covers 1671 km in 30 hrs 10 mins.

Route & halts

The important halts of the train are:

 Durg Junction
 
 
 
 
 
 
 
 
 
 
 
 
 
 
 
 Firozpur Cantonment

Schedule

Traction

After Bathinda Junction, both trains are hauled by a Ludhiana Loco Shed-based WDM-3A diesel locomotive & vice versa.

See also 
 Antyodaya Express

Notes

References 

Antyodaya Express trains
Rail transport in Chhattisgarh
Rail transport in Madhya Pradesh
Rail transport in Uttar Pradesh
Rail transport in Haryana
Rail transport in Punjab, India
Railway services introduced in 2018